The Hunted Woman is a 1925 American silent drama film directed by Jack Conway and starring Seena Owen, Earl Schenck, and Victor McLaglen.

Plot
As described in a film magazine review, a young woman goes North to find out whether her husband is dead or alive and also to effect the release of her innocent brother from jail. She meets a youth who has staked out a gold claim and has a romance with him. She does not surrender her love until her husband is found and killed, meeting death in a fight with the youth's partner.

Cast

Preservation
With no prints of The Hunted Woman located in any film archives, it is a lost film.

References

Bibliography
 Munden, Kenneth White. The American Film Institute Catalog of Motion Pictures Produced in the United States, Part 1. University of California Press, 1997.

External links

1925 films
1925 drama films
Silent American drama films
American silent feature films
1920s English-language films
Fox Film films
Films directed by Jack Conway
American black-and-white films
Films based on works by James Oliver Curwood
1920s American films